John Lungu (born 12 June 1966) is a Zambian former footballer who played as a midfielder. He played in 34 matches for the Zambia national team from 1993 to 1998. He was also named in Zambia's squad for the 1998 African Cup of Nations tournament.

References

External links
 

1966 births
Living people
Zambian footballers
Association football midfielders
Zambia international footballers
1998 African Cup of Nations players
Zambia Super League players
Roan United F.C. players
Place of birth missing (living people)